George Isaac Smith MBE (April 6, 1909 – December 19, 1982) was a Canadian lawyer and politician who served as the 18th premier of Nova Scotia from 1967 to 1970. He was a Canadian senator from 1975 until his death. G.I. Smith is noted for having recruited Robert Stanfield to help rebuild and lead the Progressive Conservatives in Nova Scotia. While Premier he brought Michelin Tire, still Nova Scotia's biggest employer, to the province. He established the Nova Scotia Human Rights Commission, had the government take over Sydney Steel Corporation when tts corporate owners closed it down, thus preserving 3,000 jobs. His government established  the affordable  housing community of Lower Sackville.

Earlier in his Ministerial years, as Highways Minister (1956–62) he built the Bicentennial Highway and paved a great many miles of roads throughout the province. As Finance and Economics Minister (1962–67)  He was most noted for creating the Voluntary Economic Planning organization  through which, business labour and community and academic leaders worked to develop economic plans for  the province going forward..

Also he worked with Premier Stanfield and cabinet colleagues  to create Industrial Estates  Limited, a pioneering new body designed to attract industry to Nova Scotia,

Biography
Born in Stewiacke, Nova Scotia on April 6, 1909 to Major John Robert Smith and Susan Ettinger Coulter. Educated at Stewiacke School and Colchester County Academy, Truro.   He then attended Dalhousie University and graduated  with  LLB in 1932.  He became Stewiacke town  solicitor and Town Clerk.  A few years later he joined with Tatamagouche native, and former Yarmouth federal Conservative candidate, Frank Patterson to establish a Truro Law  firm Patterson Smith, where he practiced law in Truro.  He served overseas in the North Nova Scotia Highlanders during World War II and was mentioned in dispatches, and ended up with rank of Lt. Colonel and was commanding officer of the regiment.

Smith was elected as a Member of the Legislative Assembly (MLA) for Colchester County in 1949 and served until 1974. He  joined  Robert Stanfield's cabinet when the Tories formed government in 1956. In 1967 when Stanfield left to become National PC leader, he made it clear that he  would only do so if Smith would agree to succeed him as Premier of Nova Scotia.

Smith's government was defeated by the Liberals in 1970 and Smith resigned as party leader the next year. In 1975 he was summoned to the Senate of Canada by Prime Minister Pierre Trudeau and represented the senatorial division of Colchester, Nova Scotia. In the Senate Smith was a vigorous advocate of equalization payments and fair treatment of all provinces.

Smith died in office in Truro, Nova Scotia on December 19, 1982.

In 1938, Smith married Law Firm Secretary Sally Archibald of Truro. Together they had three children John Robert (Rob), Ruby Alison and George Isaac.  Sally Smith died on March 26, 2011, her 95th birthday.  Youngest Son George died on Christmas Day 2012, age 58.

See also
List of political parties in Canada

References

External links
Summary Results from 1867 to 2011 

1909 births
1982 deaths
Canadian senators from Nova Scotia
Canadian people of British descent
Canadian Members of the Order of the British Empire
Members of the United Church of Canada
Lawyers in Nova Scotia
Progressive Conservative Association of Nova Scotia MLAs
People from Colchester County
Premiers of Nova Scotia
20th-century Canadian lawyers
Nova Scotia political party leaders